Buncom may refer to:

Buncom, Oregon, a mining town
Frank Buncom, an American football linebacker